Plassey is a railway station of the Sealdah-Lalgola line in the Eastern Railway zone of Indian Railways. The station is situated in Nadia district in the Indian state of West Bengal. It serves Palashi and the surrounding areas.

History
Initially the Calcutta–Kusthia line of Eastern Bengal Railway was opened to traffic in 1862. The Ranaghat–Lalgola branch line was established in 1905 as an extension of Sealdah–Ranaghat line. This railway station was named Plassey in accordance with the British pronunciation of "Palashi". After the electrification and inauguration of double track by the Indian Railways, Plassey station was modified and reconstructed into three platforms.

Electrification
The Krishnanagar– section was electrified in 2004. In 2010 the line became double tracked.

References

Railway stations in Nadia district
Sealdah railway division
Kolkata Suburban Railway stations